Puffer may refer to:

 Clyde puffer, a type of cargo ship used in the Clyde estuary and off the west coast of Scotland
 Puffer, a type of circuit breaker
 Inhaler, a medical device used for delivering medication into the body via the lungs
 Puffer machine, used to detect explosives
 Puffer train, a class of patterns in automata such as Conway's Game of Life
 Pufferfish, a type of fish in family Tetraodontidae which can inflate itself as a defence mechanism
 Puffer (surname), a surname
 Supercharger for a motor car engine
 USS Puffer, two submarine vessels of the United States Navy
 Puffer, name for a particular type of German Wheellock pistol, usually from Nuremberg or Augsburg
 Puffer jacket, a type of jacket
 "Puffer", a song by indie rock/noise pop band Speedy Ortiz from Foil Deer
Puffer (TV service), online streaming service